The  is a Japanese society established in 1987 to promote the study of mammals.

History
The Society, however, traces its origins back to the activities of the refounded  in 1923, and as such celebrated its ninetieth anniversary in 2013.

Publications
The Society publishes the quarterly journal Mammal Study, successor to the Journal of the Mammalogical Society of Japan, in English, and, in Japanese, the biannual . It also oversaw publication, in 2015, of the second edition of The Wild Mammals of Japan. A 2018 supplement to Mammalian Science comprises the Japanese names for world mammal taxa, based on the third edition of Mammal Species of the World.

See also
 List of mammals of Japan
 Japanese Red List
 Ornithological Society of Japan

References

External links
  The Mammal Society of Japan
  Mammal Study
  The Mammal Society of Japan
  Catalogue of Standard Japanese Names for the Mammals of the World

Mammalogy
Environmental organizations based in Japan
1987 establishments in Japan
Scientific organizations established in 1987
Biology organizations